Derek Grant (born March 18, 1974) is a Canadian retired professional ice hockey player.

Early life 
Born in 1974 in Cornwall, Ontario, Grant played three seasons in the Ontario Hockey League with the Newmarket Royals, Niagara Falls Thunder, and Ottawa 67's.

Career 
Grant made his professional debut during the 1994–95 AHL season with the Adirondack Red Wings of the American Hockey League. He joined the Memphis RiverKings of the Central Hockey League (CHL) for the 1995–96 CHL season, where he won the CHL Rookie of the Year Trophy. Grant remained with the RiverKings for another five seasons, and retired from professional hockey following the 2000–01 CHL season.

In December 2007, as part of the team's 1,000th game celebration, Grant was selected as a member of the All RiverKIngs Team.

Career statistics

Awards and honours

References

External links

1974 births
Living people
Adirondack Red Wings players
Canadian ice hockey centres
Indianapolis Ice players
Macon Whoopee (CHL) players
Memphis RiverKings players
Newmarket Royals players
Niagara Falls Thunder players
Ottawa 67's players
South Carolina Stingrays players
Ice hockey people from Ontario
Sportspeople from Cornwall, Ontario